Gregg Alexander (born Gregory Aiuto; May 4, 1970) is an American musician, singer-songwriter and producer. He is best known as the frontman of the New Radicals, who had an international hit with "You Get What You Give" in late 1998. He dissolved the New Radicals in 1999 to focus on production and songwriting work, winning a Grammy Award for the song "The Game of Love" in 2003. He later co-wrote songs for the film Begin Again, including "Lost Stars", which was nominated for an Academy Award for Best Original Song.

Early life and career
Gregg Alexander was born in Grosse Pointe, Michigan, United States, and raised in a conservative Jehovah's Witness household. He received his first guitar at the age of 12 and taught himself to play several instruments. Along with his sister, Caroline, they'd play the piano and Gregg would compose songs. At age 14, Gregg joined the band The Circus, with classmates George Snow and John Mabarak, along with Gregg's older brother, Stephen Aiuto. They played the 1984 high school "battle of the bands," competing against John Lowery (who would later become known as John 5). By the age of 16, he had signed his first recording contract with A&M after playing his demo tapes to producer Rick Nowels. He released his debut album Michigan Rain in 1989 at the age of 19 to little notice. In 1992, he signed to Epic and released Intoxifornication, which consisted largely of re-released songs from Michigan Rain, and was again ignored.

In the mid-1990s, Alexander busked in Tompkins Square Park and Central Park.

New Radicals

In 1997, Alexander formed the New Radicals, a revolving-door band with no permanent members other than Alexander and long-term collaborator Danielle Brisebois. They released the album Maybe You've Been Brainwashed Too in October 1998, which went on to sell more than one million copies. The single "You Get What You Give" was released that autumn and was an international hit.

It was not long after the New Radicals' success that Alexander became tired of the constant media attention and exhausting touring schedule. In July 1999, "Someday We'll Know" was announced as the band's second single, Several days later, Alexander announced he was disbanding the New Radicals to focus on production work. He said that "the fatigue of traveling and getting three hours sleep in a different hotel every night to do boring 'hanging and schmoozing' with radio and retail people is definitely not for me." Despite disagreements with MCA, Alexander finally agreed to shoot a video for "Someday We'll Know." But with the band then defunct, the song got little attention and the New Radicals became known as a one-hit wonder.

On January 20, 2021, New Radicals reunited for the first time in 22 years on inauguration day for President Joe Biden to perform "You Get What You Give". The song was used as a rally song during Biden's campaign events and a favorite of Joe's son Beau Biden, who died in 2015. The song's lyrics were recited by his sister Ashley during his eulogy at his funeral. The band had rejected offers to reform over the past 22 years but wanted to honor this day and honor Beau, who was a military veteran. "We pledged if Joe [Biden] won, we’d get together and play our little song both in memory and in honor of our new president’s patriot son Beau and also with the prayer of Joe being able to bring our country together again with compassion, honesty and justice for a change." Alexander said prior to their performance.

Post–New Radicals
Since disbanding the group in the summer of 1999, Alexander has written and produced hit songs for many artists, including Ronan Keating (e.g. co-producing and co-writing the album Destination), Sophie Ellis-Bextor, Enrique Iglesias, Texas, Geri Halliwell, S Club 7, Melanie C, Mónica Naranjo, Rod Stewart, Hanson and fellow ex-New Radical Danielle Brisebois. Alexander's composition "The Game of Love", recorded by Santana and Michelle Branch, earned him a Grammy Award for Best Pop Collaboration with Vocals at the 45th Annual Grammy Awards.

AllMusic's Stephen Thomas Erlewine described Alexander as "the catchiest, smartest professional mainstream pop songwriter of the early 2000s."

In 2004, a new Alexander track, "A Love Like That," was released uncredited on the Internet. It was suspected to be a New Radicals outtake, as parts of the lyrics were found in the booklet for Maybe You've Been Brainwashed Too.

Alexander collaborated with Hanson, co-writing the song "Lost Without Each Other," which was included on Hanson's 2004 album, Underneath.

A new song entitled "Why Can't We Make Things Work" written by Alexander (and Rick Nowels) was released by Any Dream Will Do winner Lee Mead in November 2007, on his self-titled album.

In 2003, he wrote four songs on Enrique Iglesias' album 7, under the pseudonym Alex Ander

In 2010, Boyzone released the single "Love Is a Hurricane," written by Gregg Alexander and Danielle Brisebois.

Alexander co-wrote and co-produced the music for the musical romance-drama film Begin Again, along with long-time collaborators Danielle Brisebois and Rick Nowels, as well as Nick Lashley.  Their song "Lost Stars," written for the film, was nominated for Best Original Song at the 2015 Academy Awards. On the soundtrack album, Alexander, Brisebois, Nowels and Lashley are credited under the name Cessyl Orchestra.

On November 4, 2014, Alexander appeared and performed publicly for the first time in 15 years at the Hollywood Music in Media Awards, singing "Lost Stars."

Alexander assisted with production of The Struts' reissued album, Everybody Wants. He co-wrote two songs on the album: "The Ol' Switcheroo" and "Put Your Money on Me."

Alexander co-wrote and provided backup vocals for Spencer Ludwig's 2016 single, "Right Into U." He has also co-written the Kaiser Chiefs' 2019 song "The Only Ones," alongside Nick Lashley and Rick Nowels.

On January 20, 2021, Alexander performed "You Get What You Give" in honor of United States President Joe Biden's Inauguration.

Discography

Albums
 Michigan Rain (1989)
 Intoxifornication (1992)

Singles
 "In the Neighborhood" (1989)
 "Smokin' in Bed" (1992)
 "The Truth" (1992)

Others
 "Promise Tomorrow Tonight" (1994, duet with Danielle Brisebois on her album Arrive All over You)
 "A Love Like That" (2003, digital download)

References

1970 births
Living people
American street performers
American male singer-songwriters
Record producers from Michigan
People from Grosse Pointe, Michigan
Former Jehovah's Witnesses
Singer-songwriters from Michigan